Mbeki Mwalimu is a Kenyan actress, producer and director with over 10 years of theater and TV experience. She began her career in Kenya's theatre scene in 2004 at Mbalamwezi Players before joining the Festival Of Creative Arts (FCA) in 2007 and has since become a household name as a stage and screen actor, production manager, stage director and producer.

She is famed for stage plays within FCA  and for her role as Zoe Mackenzie in the  2018 Swahili telenovela Selina on Maisha Magic and has also been featured in the film Sincerely Daisy, which premiered on Netflix on October 9, 2020.

Career
She has worked as a TV presenter at the Kenya Broadcasting Corporation and hosted the shows Good Morning Kenya and The Ultimate Choir.

She founded her theatre outfit Back to Basics in 2018, with the aim of growing  the theatre life in Kenya.

She is also  a committee member in the Kenya Actors Guild (KAG).

She started The Mbeki Mwalimu Initiative (TMI), a foundation geared towards making difference in the lives of needy Children through provision of basic supplies and mentorship.

Awards 
She won the Best Theatre Director in 2018 – Sanaa Awards.

References 

Living people
Kenyan stage actresses
Year of birth missing (living people)
Kenyan television actresses